Evans-Mumbower Mill is a historic grist mill located on Wissahickon Creek in Upper Gwynedd Township, Montgomery County, Pennsylvania.  It was built 1835, and is a -story, banked-stucco-over-stone building with a two-story, wood-frame reproduction addition.  It was in use as a mill until 1930.  It housed an Oliver Evans milling system.

The Evans-Mumbower Mill is now owned by the Wissahickon Valley Watershed Association.  The mill is open for public tours and demonstrations once a month.

The mill was added to the National Register of Historic Places in 2008.

References

External links
 Evans-Mumbower Mill Open House Tours & Events - Wissahickon Valley Watershed Association

Grinding mills on the National Register of Historic Places in Pennsylvania
Industrial buildings completed in 1835
Grinding mills in Montgomery County, Pennsylvania
Museums in Montgomery County, Pennsylvania
Mill museums in Pennsylvania
National Register of Historic Places in Montgomery County, Pennsylvania